Le is a romanization of several rare East Asian surnames and a common Vietnamese surname.

It is a fairly common surname in the United States, ranked 975th during the 1990 census and 368th during the 2000 census. In 2000, it was the eighth-most-common surname among America's Asian and Pacific Islander population, predominantly from its Vietnamese use. It was also reported among the top 200 surnames in Ontario, Canada, based on a survey of that province's Registered Persons Database of Canadian health card recipients as of the year 2000.

Origins of surname

Vietnamese
 Lê is a Vietnamese surname written  in Hán-Nôm. It is usually pronounced  in English, with it being mistaken for another surname, with similar spelling, Lý.

Chinese
Mandarin

 Le is the Pinyin romanization of the Chinese surname (written 乐 in Simplified Chinese characters and 樂 in Traditional Chinese characters); it is Lok in Cantonese.

Minnan
 Lê or Le is the POJ romanization of the Chinese surname Li (Lí)

People with the surname

Vietnamese

Lê
Anterior Lê dynasty
The Lê dynasty
Lê Công Vinh, football player
Lê Hoàn, founding emperor of the Anterior Lê dynasty
Dinh Q Lê
Lê Duẩn
Lê Đức Anh
Dowager Empress Gia Từ, originally of the Lê clan of Vĩnh Lộc District
Lê Hằng Phấn
Lê Huỳnh Đức, football player
Lê Khả Phiêu
 Lê Lâm Quỳnh Như, Vietnamese-American singer known as Như Quỳnh 
Lê Lợi, founding emperor of the Lê dynasty
Nguyên Lê
Lê Minh Đảo
Lê Nhân Tông
Lê Quan Ninh, French percussionist
Lê Quang Liêm, chess player
Lê Quang Tung, commander of ARVN Special Forces
Lê Quý Đôn
Lê Văn Duyệt, general of Gia Long and viceroy of southern Vietnam
Lê Văn Hưng
Lê Văn Khôi, adopted son of Le Van Duyet
Lê Văn Thiêm
Lê Thái Tông, second emperor of the Lê dynasty 
Lê Thánh Tông, fifth emperor of the Lê dynasty
Lê Tuấn Hùng 
Lê Long Đĩnh, the last emperor of the Anterior Lê dynasty

Le
Annie Le
Cung Le (born 1972), Vietnamese-born American martial artist
Duy-Loan Le
Hoang Le
Linda Le, Vietnamese-American cosplayer and model
Michelle Le
Minh Le
Tony Le-Nguyen
Thuy Thu Le
Tuan Le
Danny "Shiphtur" Le, Canadian League of Legends player

Chinese 

 Le Jingyi, a former swimmer from China who won the gold medal in the 100 meters freestyle at the 1996 Summer Olympics in Atlanta, USA

Other people
 Francesca Le

See also
 Le (disambiguation)
 Lí (黎)
 Lee (Korean surname)

References

Surnames
Chinese-language surnames
Vietnamese-language surnames
Hokkien-language surnames
Surnames of Vietnamese origin
vi:Lê (họ)